North Korea has issued registration plates for all government and privately owned vehicles since 1947. The system is loosely based on that found in Japan insofar as numerical prefixes are applied to denote a particular type or class of vehicle.

Plate types

Private
Privately owned vehicles display orange plates with black characters. The first two denote the place of registration in the Chosongul script. The remainder are the vehicle's actual registration number. Early examples contained up to four digits. Those issued since 1992 can have up to five digits split into two groups by a hyphen.

Example of a private plate issued in Pyongyang before 1992

Example of a current series (post-1992) private plate issued in South Pyongan Province

State-owned
State-owned vehicles follow the same format as the current private series, except that the first digit specifies the vehicle type, and the hyphen which separates the groups is optional. The prefix 4 has never been used – possibly because it is considered unlucky in Korea and most of East Asia. Taxis and cars share the same prefix, except the former will only be followed by three digits, whilst the latter can have up to five.

The following table explains which prefixes are allocated to which vehicles.

Example of a current series bus plate issued in Pyongyang

Current series state-owned HGV plate issued in North Hamgyong Province

Pre-1992 motorcycle plate issued in North Hamgyong Province (note that these are black on yellow)

Diplomatic
Ambassadorial and diplomatic vehicles are furnished with plates containing white characters on a blue background (two shades have been observed in use and are illustrated in the examples which follow). The first character is the Chosongul syllable 외 (oe, literal meaning: 'outside'). This is followed by up to five digits separated by a hyphen. The first two digits indicate the embassy.

Former series diplomatic plate issued to staff at the Hungarian embassy

Current series diplomatic plate issued to the Indonesian ambassador (note the additional hyphen and different shade of blue)

Military
Ordinary personnel vehicles of the Korean People's Army (e.g. trucks and cars) are issued with plates composed entirely of white numbers (separated into two groups by a hyphen) on a black background. A newer series, which is identical those found on state-owned vehicles, is known to exist – the key difference being that the prefix digit does not reflect the vehicle type. Just as is the case in Russia, the registration mark is painted in large characters on the rear of the vehicle above its regular plate.

Regular military personnel plate

New-style military personnel plate issued in Pyongyang

Heavy duty military vehicles (e.g. TELs and tanks) are not issued with registration plates. Instead, the mark is painted or stencilled onto the actual chassis with white paint.

A series of 'provisional' or 'temporary' plates exists for military vehicles which are used in a testing capacity. These are produced in the same convention as plates for state-owned vehicles but feature a red encircled star in the centre plus two diagonal bars. The words 'People's Army' ('인민군') and 'Test' ('시험') feature in the lower-right corner of the plate.

Trolleybuses
Trolleybuses are fitted with large white plates composed of nothing more than a three-digit mark. This mark corresponds with the vehicle's unit or fleet number. Because they are unable to leave the confines of the town or city where they are based, it is not uncommon for trolleybuses in other parts of the country to carry the same mark.

Current series trolleybus registration plate

Kŭmgangsan Special Zone
Vehicles – specifically buses and minibuses – stationed in the Mount Kumgang Tourist Region are issued with green plates with white characters bearing the word 'Kŭmgangsan' (Mount Kumgang) in Chosongul, followed by four digits.

Red Cross
Vehicles used by members and volunteers of the International Red Cross Movement are fitted with blue plates 
featuring the Chosongul phonetic transliteration of the abbreviation 'RC' (아르씨), followed by a hyphen and serial number, in white.

United Nations
Vehicles used by U.N. delegates display black plates which feature the word 'UNICEF' ('유니쎄프' Yunissepŭ) rendered in Chosongul, followed by a hyphen and a serial number, in white.

References

External links
License Plates of North Korea

Korea, North
Transport in North Korea
North Korea transport-related lists